This is a list of public outdoor clothes-free areas for recreation. Includes free beaches (or clothing-optional beaches or nude beaches), parks, clubs, regional organizations and some resorts.


Regions 
 List of social nudity places in Africa
 List of social nudity places in Asia
 List of social nudity places in Europe
 List of social nudity places in North America
 List of social nudity places in Oceania
 List of social nudity places in South America

See also

 List of social nudity organizations
 Naturism
 Nude recreation

Further reading

External links 

 True Nudists Locations
 Bare Beaches
 
 Gay Naked Destinations

Social nudity

Lists of lists